"Cocoon" is a song performed by German duo Milky Chance. It was released as a digital download on 11 November 2016 through Lichtdicht as the lead single from their second studio album Blossom. The song was written by Milky Chance and produced by Milky Chance and Tobias Kuhn.

Music video
A music video to accompany the release of "Cocoon" was filmed in Latvia and first released onto YouTube on 11 November 2016 at a total length of four minutes and forty-eight seconds.

Track listing

Charts

Weekly charts

Year-end charts

Certifications

Release history

References

2016 singles
2016 songs